Rogue Taxidermy is the sixth studio album released by Houston, Texas folk punk band Days N' Daze. The album was self-released by the band in 2013, sold at their shows and online. The album has at various times been made available for free by the band.

Track listing

References

2013 albums
Albums free for download by copyright owner
Days N' Daze albums